James Peter Pollitt (born 1826 at St Leonards-on-Sea, Sussex; died in 1860 at Brighton, Sussex) was an English cricketer.

Pollitt made his first-class debut for the North in 1847 against the Marylebone Cricket Club. In 1849, he played a single first-class match for the Fast Bowlers against the Slow Bowlers; this match indicates that Pollitt was a fast bowler of some nature.

In 1850, he made his debut for a Middlesex side in a County match against Surrey. Pollitt played one further match for Middlesex against the Marylebone Cricket Club in 1851.

In 1850, he played a single first-class match for a Hampshire team against an All-England Eleven. In 1851, Pollitt made his debut for the Marylebone Cricket Club against Sussex. He made 2 further appearances for the club Cambridge University and Sussex.

Pollitt also played an additional first-class match for Marylebone Cricket Club and Metropolitan Clubs against an All-England Eleven in 1850. From 1851 to 1853, he also stood as an Umpire in 4 first-class matches.

Pollitt died in 1860 at Brighton, Sussex.

External links
James Pollitt at Cricinfo
James Pollitt at CricketArchive

1826 births
1860 deaths
Sportspeople from Hastings
English cricketers
Middlesex cricketers
Hampshire cricketers
Marylebone Cricket Club cricketers
English cricket umpires
Marylebone Cricket Club and Metropolitan Clubs cricketers
North v South cricketers
Fast v Slow cricketers